A supermodel is a fashion model with a worldwide reputation.

Supermodel may also refer to:
 Supermodel (album), a 2014 album by Foster the People
 "Supermodel (You Better Work)", a 1992 song by RuPaul
 "Supermodel" (Jill Sobule song), a 1995 song by Jill Sobule
 "Supermodel" (Måneskin song), 2022
 Supermodels (Romanian TV series) a 2015 reality-TV series
 Supermodel (Swiss TV series), a 2007 reality-TV series
 Super Model (film), a 2013 Hindi film
 Supermodel (film), a 2015 American film
 "Super Model", an episode of Aqua Teen Hunger Force

See also
Supermodelo